Thomas Hearne or Hearn (Latin: Thomas Hearnius, July 167810 June 1735) was an English diarist and prolific antiquary, particularly remembered for his published editions of many medieval English chronicles and other important historical texts.

Life
Hearne was born at Littlefield Green in the parish of White Waltham, Berkshire, the son of George Hearn, the parish clerk. Having received his early education from his father, he showed such taste for study that a wealthy neighbour, Francis Cherry of Shottesbrooke (c. 1665–1713), a celebrated nonjuror, interested himself in the boy, and sent him to the school at Bray "on purpose to learn the Latin tongue". Soon Cherry took him into his own house, and his education was continued at Bray until Easter 1696 when he matriculated at St Edmund Hall, Oxford.

At the university, he attracted the attention of Dr John Mill (1645–1707), the principal of St Edmund Hall, who employed him to compare manuscripts and in other ways. Having taken the degree of B.A. in 1699 he was made assistant keeper of the Bodleian Library, where he worked on the catalogue of books, and in 1712 he was appointed second keeper. In 1715 Hearne was elected Architypographus and Esquire Bedell in civil law in the university, but objection having been made to his holding this office together with that of second librarian, he resigned it in the same year.

A nonjuror himself, he refused to take the oaths of allegiance to King George I, and early in 1716 he was deprived of his librarianship, and "he was, in fact, locked out of the library". However, he continued to reside in Oxford, and occupied himself in editing the English chroniclers. Hearne refused several important academic positions, including the librarianship of the Bodleian and the Camden professorship of ancient history, rather than take the oaths. He died on 10 June 1735.

The readers of Hearne's works were devoted to them because of the depth of scholarship. He corresponded, for example, with Dr Henry Levett, an early English physician and medical doctor at Charterhouse, London. In November 1715, indicating the devotion of Hearne's readers, he reminded Dr Levett that "you formerly desired to be a subscriber for every Thing I published. I have accordingly put you down for one copy of Acts of the Ap. in Capitals".

Works
Hearne's most important work was done as editor of many of the English chronicles, and until the appearance of the Rolls Series his editions were in some cases the only ones existent. Some have praised them for being well prepared and sourced.

Among the most important of a long list are:
Benedict of Peterborough's (Benedictus Abbas) De vita et gestis Henrici II. et Ricardi I. (1735)
John of Fordun's Scotichronicon (1722)
the monk of Evesham's Historia vitae et regni Ricardi II (1729)
Robert Mannyng's translation of Piers Langtoft's Chronicle (1725)
the work of Thomas Otterbourne and John Whethamstede as Duo rerum Anglicarum scriptores veteres (1732)
Robert of Gloucester's Chronicle (1724)
Thomae Sprotti Chronica (1719); Hearne's title is now thought to be misleading about this work, of the end of the 14th century, too late to be by Thomas Sprott the Benedictine chronicler (fl. 1292).
the Vita et gesta Henrici V, which he wrongly attributed to Thomas Elmham and which now goes under the designation Ps-Elmham (1727)
the Vita Henrici V of Tito Livio Frulovisi (1716)
Walter of Hemingburgh's Chronicon (1731)
William of Newburgh's Historia rerum Anglicarum (1719).

He also edited:
John Leland's Itinerary (1710–1712) and the same author's Collectanea (1715)
William Camden's Annales rerum Anglicarum et Hibernicarum regnante Elizabetha (1717)
Sir John Spelman's Life of Alfred (1709)
William Roper's Life of Sir Thomas More (1716).

He brought out editions of:
Livy (1708)
Pliny's Epistolae et panegyricus (1703)
Acts of the Apostles (1715).

Among his other compilations were: 
Ductor historicus, a Short System of Universal History (1698, 1704, 1705, 1714, 1724)
A Collection of Curious Discourses by Eminent Antiquaries (1720)
Reliquiae Bodleianae (1703).

Hearne left his manuscripts to William Bedford, who sold them to Dr Richard Rawlinson, who in his turn bequeathed them to the Bodleian. Two volumes of extracts from his voluminous diary were published by Philip Bliss (Oxford, 1857), and afterwards an enlarged edition in three volumes appeared (London, 1869). A large part of his diary entitled Remarks and Collections, 1705–1714, edited by C. E. Doble and D. W. Rannie, has been published by the Oxford Historical Society (1885–1898). Bibliotheca Hearniana, excerpts from the catalogue of Hearn's library, was edited by Beriah Botfield (1848).

Hearne's work in publishing these old manuscripts was not appreciated by all: Alexander Pope dismisses them as unappealing and "monkish" in An Epistle to Burlington and satirises Hearne as the pedant Wormius in The Dunciad, dropping into mock-Old English to do so.  This in turn led Hearne in his diary to insult Pope's lack of scholarship.

Footnotes

References
Impartial Memorials of the Life and Writings of Thomas Hearn by several hands (1736)
William Dunn Macray, Annals of the Bodleian Library (1890).
Hearne's autobiography in W. Huddesford's Lives of Leland, Hearne and Wood (Oxford, 1772)
Frederic Ouvry's Letters addressed to Thomas Hearn, privately printed (London, 1874)

External links

 Someone Dead Ruined My Life... Again., a video by CGP Grey that covers the Hearne - Pope rivalry

1678 births
1735 deaths
People from White Waltham
English antiquarians
Alumni of St Edmund Hall, Oxford
English diarists
Fellows of St Edmund Hall, Oxford